Madurese may refer to:

Madurese people
Madurese language
Madurese cuisine

Language and nationality disambiguation pages